The Thomisidae are a family of spiders, including about 170 genera and over 2,100 species. The common name crab spider is often linked to species in this family, but is also applied loosely to many other families of spiders. Many members of this family are also known as flower spiders or flower crab spiders.

Description 
Members of this family of spiders do not spin webs, and are ambush predators. The two front legs are usually longer and more robust than the rest of the legs. The back two legs are smaller, and are usually covered in a series of strong spines. They have dull colorations such as brown, grey, or very bright green, pink, white or yellow. They gain their name from the shape of their body, and they usually move sideways or backwards. These spiders are quite easy to identify and can very rarely be confused with Sparassidae family, though the crab spiders are usually smaller.

Etymology
Spiders in this family are called "crab spiders" due to their resemblance to crabs, the way such spiders hold their two front pairs of legs, and their ability to scuttle sideways or backwards. The Thomisidae are the family most generally referred to as "crab spiders", though some members of the Sparassidae are called "giant crab spiders", the Selenopidae are called "wall crab spiders", and various members of the Sicariidae are sometimes called "six-eyed crab spiders". Some distantly related orb-weaver spider species such as Gasteracantha cancriformis also are sometimes called "crab spiders".

Behavior

Thomisidae do not build webs to trap prey, though all of them produce silk for drop lines and sundry reproductive purposes; some are wandering hunters and the most widely known are ambush predators. Some species sit on or beside flowers or fruit, where they grab visiting insects. Individuals of some species, such as Misumena vatia and Thomisus spectabilis, are able to change color over a period of some days, to match the flower on which they are sitting. Some species frequent promising positions among leaves or bark, where they await prey, and some of them sit in the open, where they are startlingly good mimics of bird droppings. However, these members of the family Thomisidae are not to be confused with the spiders that generally are called bird-dropping spiders, not all of which are close relatives of crab spiders.

Other species of crab spiders with flattened bodies either hunt in the crevices of tree trunks or under loose bark, or shelter under such crevices by day, and come out at night to hunt. Members of the genus Xysticus hunt in the leaf litter on the ground. In each case, crab spiders use their powerful front legs to grab and hold on to prey while paralysing it with a venomous bite.

The spider family Aphantochilidae was incorporated into the Thomisidae in the late 1980s. Aphantochilus species mimic Cephalotes ants, on which they prey.

The spiders of Thomisidae are not known to be harmful to humans. However, spiders of a distantly related genus, Sicarius, which are sometimes referred to as "crab spiders", or "six-eyed crab spiders", are close cousins to the recluse spiders, and are highly venomous, though human bites are rare.

Sexual dimorphism
Several different types of sexual dimorphism have been recorded in crab spiders. Some species exhibit color dimorphisms; however, the most apparent dimorphism is the difference in size between males and females. In some species, this is relatively small; females of Misumena vatia are roughly twice the size of their male counterparts. In other cases, the difference is extreme; on average, female Thomisus onustus are more than 60 times as massive as the males.

Several hypothesized explanations are given for the evolution of sexual size dimorphisms in the Thomisidae and other sister taxa. The most widely acknowledged hypothesis for female growth is the fecundity hypothesis: selection favors larger females so they can produce more eggs and healthier offspring. Because males do not carry and lay eggs, a growth in size does not confer a fitness advantage.

However, sexual size dimorphism may be a result of male dwarfism. The gravity hypothesis states that the smaller size allows the male to travel with greater ease, providing him with an increased opportunity to find mates. Females are comparatively stationary, and their larger size allows them to capture larger prey, such as butterflies and bees, granting females the additional nutrients necessary for egg production.

Other hypotheses propose that sexual size dimorphism evolved by chance, and no selective advantage exists to larger females or smaller males.

Taxonomy

, this large family contains around 171 genera:

See also
Philodromidae, also called crab spiders

References

External links
 Pictures of crab spiders (free for noncommercial use)
 Photos of crab spiders hosted by University of California, Berkeley

 
Araneomorphae families
Taxa named by Carl Jakob Sundevall